Adela and Irmina refers to two sisters and princesses, Adela of Pfalzel  (? - 735) and Irmina of Oeren (? - c. 716), who are jointly venerated on 24 December.

8th-century Christian saints
Sibling duos
Christian female saints of the Middle Ages
8th-century women